Legislative elections were held in Austria on 1 October 2006 to elect the 23rd National Council, the lower house of Austria's bicameral parliament.

The governing Austrian People's Party (ÖVP) suffered substantial losses and was unexpectedly overtaken by the Social Democratic Party of Austria (SPÖ). The Greens became the third largest party for the first time, while the Freedom Party of Austria (FPÖ) fell to fourth for the first time. The Alliance for the Future of Austria (BZÖ), competing in its first national election, narrowly passed the 4% electoral threshold, despite opinion polling which indicated it would fall short.

After the 2002 election, the ÖVP formed government with the FPÖ; in 2005, the Alliance for the Future of Austria (BZÖ) split from the FPÖ. Most of the FPÖ's National Council deputies joined the new party, which replaced the FPÖ as the junior partner in government. As a result of the 2006 election, the ÖVP–BZÖ coalition lost its majority. After three months of negotiations, the SPÖ and ÖVP formed a grand coalition under SPÖ leader Alfred Gusenbauer, which took office on 11 January 2007.

Contesting parties 
The table below lists parties represented in the 22nd National Council.

Qualified parties 
In addition to the parties already represented in the National Council, eight parties collected enough signatures to be placed on the ballot. Three of these were cleared to be on the ballot in all states, five of them only in some.

On the ballot in all 9 states 
 Alliance for the Future of Austria (BZÖ)
 Communist Party of Austria (KPÖ)
 Hans-Peter Martin's List (MATIN)

On the ballot in some states only 
 EU Withdrawal – Neutral Free Austria (NFÖ) - on the ballot only in Carinthia, Salzburg, Tyrol, Vorarlberg, and Vienna
 Socialist Left Party, List against Capitalism and Racism (SLP) - on the ballot only in Vienna
 Certainly – Absolutely – Independent, Franz Radinger – on the ballot only in Carinthia
 Initiative 2000 – on the ballot only in Burgenland
 List Strong – on the ballot only in Carinthia

Campaign

Austrian People's Party 
The Austrian People's Party contested the election with Chancellor Wolfgang Schüssel as its leader. It was the first federal election in Austria since 1970 the party entered as strongest party. Slogans used by the party in the campaign were "Secure. Austria" (Sicher. Österreich), "Austria. Here, we are well." (Österreich. Hier geht's uns gut.) and "Austria. Stays better." (Österreich. Bleibt besser.) They also attacked the Social Democratic Party, attesting them a lack of economic competence, repeatedly bringing up the so-called "BAWAG-Affair".
The ÖVP cited a rising number of academics and shorter study periods, according to them because of the introduction of tuition fees, as some of their successes. They also capitalized on their women’s policies, including being the first Austrian cabinet with half the ministers being women and appointing a woman as president of the Supreme Court for the first time.

Social Democratic Party of Austria 
The Social Democratic Party was led by Alfred Gusenbauer in the election campaign. Themes of their campaign included a rising in youth unemployment, criticism of the Schüssel government's pension reform as well as the order of Eurofighter Typhoon fighters which they wanted to cancel in the case of them entering government. They also criticized the abolishment of the Ministry for Women and promised to abolish tuition fees for universities.

After coming in first in opinion polls for a long time, from March 2006 onwards the Austrian People's Party was ahead of them. The main reason for this was believed to be the "BAWAG-Affair": the Bank for Work and Economy (Bank für Arbeit und Wirtschaft), in which the Social Democratic dominated Austrian Trade Union Federation held a majority, was hurled into turbulences, leading to disputes in the party.

On 3 September 2006 the Social Democratic Party and the Liberal Forum formed an electoral alliance with the goal to prevent a further ÖVP-led government.

Freedom Party of Austria 
The Freedom Party of Austria campaigned with party leader Heinz-Christian Strache as their leading candidate.

Media considered the initiative "Stay free Austria" (Volksbegehren "Österreich bleib frei") as start of their campaign. Some points of their party programme they highlighted were: No accession of Turkey to the European Union and rejection of the European Constitution, no rising of Austria's contributions to the European Union, aggravation of citizenship laws, stopping immigration and fighting abuse of asylum.

The Greens - The Green Alternative 
Leading candidate for the Green Party was party leader Alexander Van der Bellen.

The Greens started their pre-election campaign in May 2006 with the presentation of two "Black Books". The "Black Book black" concentrated on their criticism of the People's Party government, the "Black Book red" criticized the opposition performance of the Social Democratic Party. The Greens accused both parties of violations of human rights, with their main criticism being the 2005 reform of the asylum and foreigner's rights laws, to which the Social Democratic Party had agreed.
Central to their campaign were promotion of alternative energy, improving the situation of working women, introduction of a demand orientated basic social security (Grundsicherung), an education reform and introduction of a point-system for immigration, favouring highly qualified immigrants.

They stated abolishment of tuition fees for universities and cancelling the order for Eurofighter as conditions for entering a government.

Alliance for the Future of Austria 
The BZÖ entered the campaign with Peter Westenthaler, former floor leader of the Freedom Party, as its leading candidate.

Peter Westenthaler was elected as party leader on a special party summit on 23 June 2006. The party contested the election as "The Freedom-minded – Westenthaler's List – BZÖ" (Die Freiheitlichen – Liste Westenthaler – BZÖ). After the Freedom Party obtained a preliminary injunction, the BZÖ had to remove the phrase "The Freedom-minded" from its billboards – it remained on ballot papers nonetheless.

The party presented an election programme with the title "10 points against a shift to the left in Austria". Policies included: lowering of number of foreigners by 30%, limits for the share of non-native German speakers in classes and termination of the European Union's accession talks with Turkey.

On 25 September, six days before the election, Minister of Justice Karin Gastinger, deputy leader of the BZÖ and the party's leading candidate in Styria announced her leaving the party. As reason for her decision she stated that she "doesn’t want to be active in a political movement that is xenophobic, that operates with fear".

Minor parties

Communist Party of Austria 
Leading candidate for the Communist Party of Austria was Mirko Messner. Hoping for a basic mandate in the constituency Graz, the Communist Party made heavy use of the Styrian politician Ernest Kaltenegger, who managed to secure one of the best election results in the history of the party when gaining 20% of the votes in the municipal elections in Graz. Points of their election campaign included a tax for the rich as well as higher minimal pensions and wages.

Dr. Martin's List 
Hans-Peter Martin, MEP, announced in July 2006 that he intended to run with his own party. He concentrated on criticizing the established parties and trying to attract protest votes. Due to a limit on party’s short names on ballot papers to five letters the party ran as MATIN.

Opinion polling

Results

Results by state

Summary 
The ÖVP lost many of the votes they had taken from the FPÖ in the 2002 election.
The Social Democratic Party of Austria (SPÖ) lost fewer votes and thus regained a plurality.
The Austrian Green Party received  more than 11% of the votes and pulled ahead of the Freedom Party.
The FPÖ increased their share of votes slightly but missed third place by about 500 votes.
The BZÖ, which had split off from the FPÖ in 2005, crossed the threshold of 4% and will be represented in the new parliament.
The Austrian Communist Party (KPÖ) increased its share of votes  to 1%.
The list of Hans Peter Martin received 2.8%. Both his list and the KPÖ are below the 4% threshold that is necessary for parliamentary representation.
The Liberal Forum decided not to stand in the election, citing the tight schedule as well as the lack of finances and a suitable party leader. However, on 3 September 2006 the SPÖ announced an electoral alliance with the LIF (some of the LIF's candidates will stand on the SPÖ's party list, ensuring that at least the LIF's chairman Alexander Zach will be a member of the next parliament).

References

External links 

Elections in Austria
Austria
Legislative
Austrian Parliament
Austria